Gariy Yuriyevich Napalkov (born June 27, 1948 in Gorky, now Nizhny Novgorod) is a Soviet former ski jumper who competed from 1968 to 1976. He won both ski jumping events at the 1970 FIS Nordic World Ski Championships in Vysoké Tatry.

Napalkov also competed at the 1972 Winter Olympics in Sapporo, finished 6th in the individual large hill and tied for 7th in the individual normal hill. He also had two other career victories in the normal hill (1968, 1969).

External links

1948 births
Living people
Ski jumpers at the 1968 Winter Olympics
Ski jumpers at the 1972 Winter Olympics
FIS Nordic World Ski Championships medalists in ski jumping
Olympic ski jumpers of the Soviet Union
Universiade medalists in ski jumping
Universiade gold medalists for the Soviet Union
Universiade silver medalists for the Soviet Union
Competitors at the 1970 Winter Universiade
Competitors at the 1972 Winter Universiade
Soviet male ski jumpers
Sportspeople from Nizhny Novgorod